Naval Air Station (NAS) Sigonella  is an Italian Air Force base, and a U.S. Navy installation at Italian Air Force Base Sigonella in Sicily, Italy. The whole NAS is a tenant of the Italian Air Force, which has the military and the administrative control. It serves as an Italian base for the 41º Stormo Antisom (41st Antisubmarine Warfare Wing).
NAS Sigonella acts also as landlord to more than 40 other U.S. commands and activities.

The NAS is located in the western part of the large airport structure, while the Italian military base is located in the eastern part.
Because of its location near the center of the Mediterranean Sea, NASSIG is well placed to support operations by the U.S. 6th Fleet, other U.S. military units, and U.S. allies and coalition partners.

Among the aircraft that fly from this island base are Italian Air Force ATR 72MP ( which replaced the Breguet Br.1150 Atlantic in 2017) and United States Air Force C-130, C-17 and C-5 airlifters, KC-135 and KC-10 tankers and U.S. Navy P-3 Orions, P-8 Poseidons, C-2 Greyhounds, and C-40A Clippers.

It is one of the most frequently used stops for U.S. airlift aircraft bound from the continental United States to Southwest Asia and the Indian Ocean.

NAS Sigonella has the best claim to be hub of U.S. naval air operations in the Mediterranean. The base command is landlord to more than 40 other U.S. units. Among the largest are a rotating P-3C patrol squadron; a Naval Computer and Telecommunications Station; and a U.S. Naval Hospital. The hospital was built in 1992. Previously, there was only a clinic and the closest U.S. Naval Hospital was at Naples.  Sigonella is home to more than 4,000 troops, civilian personnel, and family members.

NAS Sigonella is the Navy's second largest security command, second only to that located at Naval Support Activity Bahrain. NAS Sigonella also has a large support of security personnel from NR NSF Sigonella, a Navy Reserve command based in NOSC Detroit at Selfridge ANGB, Michigan.

The Naval Air Station comprises two sections: NAS I was the site of the original U.S. base but is now a support facility, and NAS II which includes the runways, operations and most tenant commands. NAS I also contains the Navy Exchange and Commissary, the school, and some homes, mainly for the commodore of Task Force 67, the air station commanding officer, air station executive officer and commanding officers of tenant activities. NAS I also is host to other facilities, mainly for entertainment. NAS II is now only used as a service base.

History
The United States Naval Air Facility (NAF), Sigonella, was established 15 June 1959. Its first commanding officer was Captain Walter J. Frazier. The facility was conceived in the early 1950s, when plans to base U.S. Navy P2V Neptunes at Hal Far, Malta began to outgrow the facility.

When there was no room for expansion at Malta, the U.S. Navy obtained NATO backing to be hosted by Sicilians. Italy made land available under a temporary agreement signed 25 June 1957. Six days later, Landing Ship Tank (LSTs) began to deliver equipment from the Malta base.

Ground was broken in September, and construction on the administrative area at NAF I was started in 1958. It was built on top of an airfield where damaged fighters and bombers of the German Air Force had once landed during the Second World War. The first Americans arrived for work at Sigonella in March 1959—six months before any buildings were ready—and so worked for six months in Catania at a large warehouse complex called Magazzino Generale (General Warehouse), which is opposite the cemetery on the right side of the street as one enters Catania from the base.

By the end of August 1959, the NAF II airfield was available for daylight flights under visual flight rules (VFR); 24 flights were logged by 31 August.

One of Sigonella's first buildings was what is now the American Forces Network (AFN) building. In 1958, that building was Sigonella's vector (pest) control center, where rat poison was stored. The Army Corps of Engineers next used the building for their offices, later sharing it with Special Services, or what is now called Morale, Welfare and Recreation (MWR). Around 1966, AFN came to Sigonella and joined Special Services, which soon moved out, leaving the building to the broadcasters.

Sigonella's first flood occurred mid-September 1959. The Dittaino Bridge between NAF I and NAF II was under six feet of water on 20 September and all traffic had to go through Catania. Power outages accompanied the floods.

In 1965 the Italian Air Force sited at Sigonella the 41st Antisubmarine Warfare Wing (86st Gruppo and 88st Gruppo) with mixed crews from the Air Force and Navy.

In the 1980s, "Naval Air Facility" Sigonella was redesignated as a "Naval Air Station".

In 1983 the base was named after World War II pilot Captain Cosimo Di Palma (it), who was shot down by the Luftwaffe while on a mission with the Italian Co-belligerent Air Force and was honored with the Gold medal of Military Valor.

On the night of 10 October 1985, there were tense hours on NAS II when the Italian Carabinieri, Italian Air Force, and the US Army's Delta Force came close to firing upon one another following the interception by US Navy F-14 Tomcat fighters of an Egyptian Boeing 737 airliner carrying the hijackers of the Italian cruise ship, the Achille Lauro, which had been commandeered by members of the PLO on 7 October. The hijackers had killed a Jewish American Leon Klinghoffer. The F-14s instructed the Egyptian plane to land at Sigonella where the Americans had planned to take the hijackers into custody. The Italian Prime Minister Bettino Craxi instead claimed the hijackers were under Italian jurisdiction. The Italian authorities, therefore, refused to allow the Navy SEALs to board the plane, threatening to open fire on the Americans had they made an attempt to do so. The ensuing stand-off lasted throughout the night, until President Ronald Reagan gave the orders for the Americans to stand down. The hijackers were eventually tried and sentenced by an Italian court.

In late 1985, work crews belonging to NMCB 133 were repairing and installing sidewalks in the housing area at NAS I when they uncovered a small stockpile of Luftwaffe antiaircraft ammunition. The stockpile had apparently belonged to an antiaircraft position that had been buried during raids in the Allied invasion of 1943.

On 1 April 2004, the Defense Logistics Agency (DLA) opened Defense Depot Sigonella Italy on NAS II to serve as a supply base for the Mediterranean.  DLA also provides fuel and property disposal from NAS II.

Sigonella suffered its second major flood mid December 2005.  Over 400 service members and family evacuated. In 2006, a newly installed protective berm prevented a nearly second consecutive year of flooding.

When NATO took military intervention to Libya in 2011, NAS Sigonella played an important role in US Operation Odyssey Dawn because of its short distance to the country. As Libya remained unstable in 2013, a Special Purpose Marine Air Ground Task Force–Crisis Response unit was formed and an element of this was moved to the base to be within V-22 range of Libya.

According to the investigators, the criminal operation, which involved the siphoning of jet fuel from a pipeline connecting Augusta Bay with NAS Sigonella, had been ongoing for almost 3 years and caused approximately 800,000 Euros in damages.

During the COVID-19 pandemic in Italy, most of the base including recreational facilities, daycare programs and the school were shut down to slow the spread of the COVID-19 Coronavirus.

Facilities

The Base Operating and Support Services contractor Gemmo is responsible for pest management at the station.

Airport 

Housing
Most permanent party military personnel and families are housed in Marinai, located 2 minutes from NAS II and approximately 10–15 minutes from NAS I.  Marinai flooded in December 2005 displacing many families temporarily. Also in Marinai is Boy Scout Troop 53 and Cub Scout Pack 53. Previously, "Mineo" was used as a housing base, but has since been returned to Italian Nationals and is no longer in service.  Temporarily deployed unaccompanied military personnel, typically from rotational squadrons deployed from the United States, are housed in bachelor enlisted quarters and bachelor officer quarters located at NAS II.

From 1987 to 2002, there was a base housing development Villaggio Costanzo which was located in the village of Santa Maria La Stella, in the comune of Aci Sant'Antonio, and approximately 60 minutes from NAS I. 
The closest community to the base is Motta Sant'Anastasia, where many military personnel and their families live in rented accommodation on the economy. Relations between the Americans and the local Italian nationals are cordial, despite some anti-American demonstrations outside the base protesting the Iraq War. Many Italian nationals are employed as civilian workers at the base.

Educational opportunities
Family support includes pre-Kindergarten and Department of Defense Dependent Schools (DoDDs) K-12 schooling. In-person college-level courses are delivered by several universities. In particular, the University of Maryland Global Campus – Europe (formerly the European Division) offers a wide range of courses, depending on demand.

Based units 
Flying and notable non-flying units based at NAS Sigonella.

Units marked GSU are Geographically Separate Units, which although based at Sigonella, are subordinate to a parent unit based at another location.

Italian Air Force 
Support and Special Forces Command

 Sigonella Air Base Command
 41st (Anti-submarine) Wing – P-72A
 86st (Crew training) Wing (86º Gruppo CAE)
 11st Department aircraft maintenance (11° Reparto manutenzione velivoli)

Combat Forces Command

 32nd Wing
 61st Unmanned Aerial Vehicle Squadron – MQ-1C Predator A+

Italian Navy 
Aviation Inspector for the Navy

 88nd (Anti-submarine) Wing – P-72A

United States Navy 

 Aircraft Intermediate Maintenance Detachment
 Air Operations Department – C-26D Metroliner
 Commander, Fleet Logistics Support Wing (CFLSW)
 Executive Transport Department Sigonella – C-20G Gulfstream IV
 Fleet Logistics Support Wing Detachment – Supports C-130T Hercules and C-40A Clipper on detachment
 Commander Helicopter Sea Combat Wing ATLANTIC (COMHSCWINGLANT)
 Helicopter Sea Combat Squadron 28 (HSC-28), Detachment 1 – MH-60S Seahawk
 Naval Computer and Telecommunications Station Sicily
Naval Medical Research Unit Three (NAMRU-3)
Naval Supply Systems Command (NAVSUP)

 NAVSUP Fleet Logistics Center Sigonella

Commander, U.S. Naval Forces Europe-Naval Forces Africa (CNE-CNA)

 US Sixth Fleet
 Commander Task Force 67 (CTF-67)
 TG-67.1 (Maritime Patrol) – P-8A Poseidon
 TG-67.2 (Tactical Operation Center)
 TU-67.2.1 (Mobile Tactical Operation Center)
 TG-67.3 (Unmanned Aerial Vehicles) – MQ-4C Triton

United States Air Force 
Air Combat Command (ACC)

 Sixteenth Air Force
 319th Reconnaissance Wing
 319th Operations Group
 7th Reconnaissance Squadron (GSU) – RQ-4B Global Hawk

US Air Forces in Europe - Air Forces Africa (USAFE-AFAFRICA)

 Third Air Force
 435th Air Expeditionary Wing
 409th Air Expeditionary Group
 324th Expeditionary Reconnaissance Squadron (GSU)

NATO 
NATO Alliance Ground Surveillance Force (NAGSF)

 Alliance Ground Surveillance – RQ-4D Phoenix

European Union 
EU NAVFOR Med

Operation Irini

See also
Alliance Ground Surveillance (AGS)
Mobile User Objective System (MUOS)

References

External links

 NAS Sigonella, official site
 , official site 41º Stormo AMI 
 Sigonella Community Support Group
 Google Map
 
 

United States Naval Air Stations
Military installations of the United States in Italy
Military installations established in 1959
Airports in Sicily
Italian airbases
NATO installations in Italy